Pier Graziano Gori (born 10 May 1980) is an Italian football coach and a former player who played as a goalkeeper. He is the goalkeeping coach for Benevento.

References

Living people
1980 births
Sportspeople from Taranto
Footballers from Apulia
Association football goalkeepers
Italian footballers
Taranto F.C. 1927 players
A.C. Ancona players
Fermana F.C. players
Como 1907 players
Benevento Calcio players
A.S.G. Nocerina players
U.S. Salernitana 1919 players
Venezia F.C. players
Serie B players
Serie C players
Serie D players